Britannia (a.k.a. Britannia Siding) was not strictly a railway station as such, but a named siding on the Warburton line in Melbourne,  Australia, approximately 1 km east of Yarra Junction. Originally named Richards's Siding, it was built for the use of the nearby Britannia Creek Wood Distillation Plant. It was mainly used for goods but occasionally also served passengers.

References
 ‘Britannia Creek an Essay in Wood Distillation’ by A. P. Winzenreid 
 Mark Bau's VR Website -> Gradient Diagram, Lilydale to Warburton

Disused railway stations in Melbourne